Lárus Orri Sigurðsson (born 4 June 1973), known in English as Larus Sigurdsson, is an Icelandic former professional footballer, who played most notably for Stoke City and West Bromwich Albion in England.

Club career
Sigurðsson was born in Akureyri and played with Þór Akureyri along with his father Sigurdur Larusson, who later became the manager. His cousin Þorvaldur Örlygsson who was playing in England for Stoke City recommended him to manager Lou Macari and he joined Stoke on trial. Lárus impressed Macari so much that he played him against Portsmouth before he had signed him. He played 23 times in 1994–95 and his performances were so good he won the player of the year award. He was an ever-present in 1995–96 as Stoke reached the play-offs where they lost to Leicester City. He missed just one match in 1996–97 in what was the club's final season at the Victoria Ground. He played in all but three matches in 1997–98 as Stoke suffered relegation to the third tier. he played 43 times in 1998–99 as Stoke failed to gain promotion and he was sold to West Bromwich Albion in August 1999 for a fee of £350,000 after making 228 appearances for Stoke.

He scored once for Albion, his goal coming in a 5–0 win over Portsmouth on 23 February 2002. After his professional career in England, Sigurðsson went home to his old club, Þór, and played 15 games for them in 2005. In summer 2006, he was appointed player-manager at Þór, a position he held until 31 May 2010 when he resigned after conflict with the board. On 20 July 2010, he joined ÍA, the club he played in as a youngster. His first senior appearance for ÍA came in a 4–2 win over Fjarðarbyggð. At the start of the 2011 season Lárus was appointed as the manager of KF, retiring as a player.

International career
Sigurðsson won 42 caps, scoring two goals for Iceland. He made his debut for Iceland in a July 1995 friendly against Faroe Islands, coming on as a substitute for Izudin Dervic.

Career statistics

Club
Sources:

A.  The "Other" column constitutes appearances and goals in the Anglo-Italian Cup, Football League play-offs, Football League Trophy.

International
Source:

International goals

Honours
 Stoke City
 Stoke City player of the year: 1995

References

External links
 

1973 births
Living people
Larus Sigurdsson
Association football defenders
Larus Sigurdsson
Larus Sigurdsson
Larus Sigurdsson
Stoke City F.C. players
West Bromwich Albion F.C. players
Premier League players
Expatriate footballers in England
Larus Sigurdsson
English Football League players